Iriški Venac Tower is a 170-metre-tall TV tower built of concrete on Iriški Venac near Novi Sad, Serbia. It consists of a 120-metre-tall concrete structure with two baskets on which the 30-metre-long section with FM-antennas has been placed. On the pinnacle a 20-metre-long TV antenna is placed.

History 
The tower was built in 1975 and its lower basket was partly destroyed in 1999 NATO bombing of Yugoslavia. The damage was estimated at 11.5 million dollars.

References

External links 
 

Towers in Serbia